Sherwood Wayne Chapman (September 26, 1937 – April 4, 2017) was an American football player and coach. He served as the head football coach at Morehead State University in Morehead, Kentucky from 1976 to 1978, compiling a record of 6–21–3.  There he coached future National Football League (NFL) quarterback Phil Simms.

Head coaching record

College

References

1937 births
2017 deaths
American men's basketball players
Colorado State Rams football coaches
Morehead State Eagles football coaches
Morehead State Eagles football players
Morehead State Eagles men's basketball players
Tampa Spartans football coaches
Youngstown State Penguins football coaches
High school football coaches in Florida
People from Barboursville, West Virginia
Players of American football from West Virginia